Paul Shaffner (born September 3, 1960) is an American football coach and former player.  He is currently the defensive coordinator and inside linebackers coach at Colgate University.  Shaffner served as the head football coach at Glenville State College from 2000 to 2003 and at Buffalo State College from 2004 to 2008.

Head coaching record

References

External links
 Buffalo State profile

1960 births
Living people
American football centers
Buffalo State Bengals football coaches
Glenville State Pioneers football coaches
Ithaca Bombers football players
Lafayette Leopards football coaches
Maine Maritime Mariners football coaches
Penn State Nittany Lions football coaches
High school football coaches in New York (state)